Ranjan (born as Ramanarayana Venkataramana Sarma; 2 March 1918 – 12 September 1983) was an Indian actor, singer, journalist and writer. He debuted in the 1941 movie Ashok Kumar, but gained fame in S. S. Vasan's 1948 magnum opus Chandralekha.

Early life 
Ranjan was born Ramanarayana Venkataramana Sarma in Mylapore, Madras in 1918. His family hailed from the town of Srirangam. Ranjan had his schooling in Madras and received an M. Lit degree from Madras University. While studying in college, he participated in a number of stage plays. Coincidentally, an employee of Gemini Studios, Veppattur Kittu was present at one of his plays. Impressed by Ranjan's performance, Kittu suggested his name to P. G. Raghavachari, who cast him in the M. K. Thyagaraja Bhagavathar-starrer Ashok Kumar, in which he played the role of Gautama Buddha. However, Ranjan did not have any dialogues in the film.  Following the success of Ashok Kumar, Ranjan was cast in Rishyasringar, in which he played the title role of Rishyasringa. In his early movies, Ranjan was credited as "R. Ramani, B. A." The screen name "Ranjan" was actually bestowed upon him by Jithen Banerjee of Newtone Studios.

In the 1940s, Ranjan established a School of Music and Dancing, and edited an art journal entitled Natyam. He was also awarded a Rockefeller Fellowship under the International Art Program sponsored by the Institute of International Education, New York, in 1950-51. Though Ranjan acted in a number of Bollywood movies, especially costume dramas and some social movies in the 1950s and 1960s, but his star faded by the end of 1967. 

His performances in blockbusters in Tamil - Mangamma Sabatham,  Chandralekha, En Magal made him very famous. Due to his popularity he shifted to Hindi film industry from 1951 and was active till 1966 as hero. He is best known for his roles in Hindi films like Mangala, Sindbad The Sailor, Madari, Bahut Din Huwe, Suvarn Sundari, Nishan, Magic Carpet. His come-back attempt in Tamil movies Neelamalai Thirudan (1957) was a box office hit. But his last film Captain Ranjan (1969) flopped. He did not  much opportunity to showcase his talents especially after 1960 in Tamil films.

Family 
His brother R.R. Sarma, an Architect, who graduated from the JJ School of Arts in Mumbai, designed several projects for the TVS and Murugappa Groups and collaborated his wife brother sivakumar with a UN expert for a housing project in Pallikkaranai. R.R. Sarma, whose firm did not continue after his lifetime, clearly articulated what ailed the industry. "Designing houses in Madras is back-breaking and frustrating," he'd said. He took all that in his stride and went on to create the grand Madras University centenary auditorium, the stately RBI office, Victoria Technical Institute on Anna Salai and Voluntary Health Services in Taramani.

Death 
Ranjan died of cardiac arrest at a New Jersey hotel on 12 September 1983. He was sixty-five years old at that time.

Partial filmography
(1943) Mangamma Sapatham
(1948) Chandralekha
(1949) Nishan / Hindi version of Apporva Sagodharargal
(1950) Mangala
(1952) Shin Shinaki Boobla Boo
(1954) Minnal Veeran
(1957) Neelamalai Thirudan
(1958) Hum Bhi Kuchh Kam Nahin
(1959) Madari
(1960) Air Mail
(1961) Sapera    
(1961) Jadoo Nagri
(1961) Khiladi
(1962) " SAKHI ROBIN"
(1965) Accident
(1969) Captain Ranjan (Tamil - Produced in 1960 but released in 1969)

Notes 

One of his Hindi movies of 1960 was Air Mail, which had a melodious song by Manna Day: "Tum Jo Aao To Bahar Aaye".

External links

1983 deaths
Indian male film actors
Journalists from Tamil Nadu
Male actors from Tiruchirappalli
1918 births
20th-century Indian male actors
20th-century Indian journalists
Writers from Tiruchirappalli